The Deputy Minister Handicap was a Grade III American Thoroughbred horse race run annually in early February at Gulfstream Park in Hallandale Beach, Florida. The race was open to horses age four and older and contested on dirt over a distance of six and one-half furlongs.

The race was named in honor of Deputy Minister who raced in Florida and won Gulfstream Park's Donn Handicap.  Deputy Minister was the 1981 American Champion Two-Year-Old Colt and the Canadian Two-Year Old Champion and Canadian Horse of the Year and was the Leading sire in North America in 1997 and 1998 and the Leading broodmare sire in North America in 2007.

Since inception, the event has been contested at different distances:
 6 furlongs: 1994–1998 
 6.5 furlongs : 2000 to present
 7 furlongs : 1990–1993, 1998–1999

The race is not on the 2008 list of stakes races at Gulfstream Park.

Records
Speed  record: (at current distance of 6.5 furlongs)
 1:15.17 – Native Heir (2003)

Winners since 2000

Earlier winners

1999 – Good And Tough
1998 – Irish Conquest
1997 – Templado
1996 – Jess C's Whirl
1995 – Chimes Band
1994 – I Can't Believe
1993 – Loach
1992 – Take Me Out
1991 – Unbridled
1990 – Beau Genius

Graded stakes races in the United States
Horse races in Florida
Gulfstream Park
Recurring sporting events established in 1990
Recurring events disestablished in 2007
1990 establishments in Florida
2007 disestablishments in Florida